Transcription factor Dp-1 is a protein that in humans is encoded by the TFDP1 gene.

Function 

The E2F transcription factor family (see MIM 189971) regulates the expression of various cellular promoters, particularly those involved in the cell cycle. E2F factors bind to DNA as homodimers or heterodimers in association with dimerization partner DP1. TFDP1 may be the first example of a family of related transcription factors; see TFDP2 (MIM 602160).[supplied by OMIM]

Interactions 

TFDP1 has been shown to interact with:
 E2F1, 
 E2F5,  and
 P53.

References

Further reading